The 2021–22 NBA season was the Rockets' 55th season in the National Basketball Association and 51st season in the city of Houston. On August 20, 2021, the NBA announced that the regular season for the league would begin on October 19, 2021, returning to the typical 82-game schedule following the schedule disruptions that resulted from COVID-19. After a woeful 17–55 record compiled in the previous season following the departure of James Harden in a trade to the Brooklyn Nets, the Rockets started a new era by drafting Jalen Green from the G League with the second overall pick in the 2021 NBA draft.

The Rockets were eliminated from playoff contention for the second consecutive season, which was the first time the Rockets missed the playoffs in consecutive seasons since 2010–12.

Draft

The Rockets held the second pick in the 2021 NBA draft, along with two other first-round picks from the Portland Trail Blazers and the Milwaukee Bucks entering the draft. This was the first time the Rockets had a lottery pick since the 2012 NBA draft in which they selected Jeremy Lamb with the twelfth overall pick, and it was their first time with a top-4 pick since the 2002 NBA draft in which they selected Yao Ming with the first overall pick.

The Rockets traded two future first-round picks to the Oklahoma City Thunder for the draft rights to Alperen Şengün.

Roster

Roster Notes
Point guard John Wall missed the entire season due to a hamstring injury.

Standings

Division

Conference

Notes
 z – Clinched home court advantage for the entire playoffs
 y – Clinched division title
 x – Clinched playoff spot
 pi – Clinched play-in tournament spot
 * – Division leader

Game log
The preseason and regular season schedule were announced on August 20, 2021.

Preseason 

|-style="background:#cfc;"
| 1
| October 5
| Washington
| 
| Kevin Porter Jr. (25)
| Alperen Şengün (8)
| Kevin Porter Jr. (5)
| Toyota Center11,495
| 1–0
|-style="background:#fcc;"
| 2
| October 7
| Miami
| 
| Jalen Green (20)
| Martin Jr., Wood (8)
| Dante Exum (6)
| Toyota Center10,491
| 1–1
|-style="background:#fcc;"
| 3
| October 11
| @ Toronto
| 
| Armoni Brooks (15)
| Christian Wood (7)
| Green, Porter Jr. (4)
| Scotiabank Arena9,245
| 1–2
|-style="background:#fcc;"
| 4
| October 15
| @ San Antonio
| 
| Christian Wood (19)
| Christian Wood (19)
| Kevin Porter Jr. (4)
| AT&T Center17,676
| 1–3

Regular season

|-style="background:#fcc;"
| 1
| October 20
| @ Minnesota
| 
| Christian Wood (16)
| Christian Wood (9)
| Jalen Green (4)
| Target Center16,079
| 0–1
|-style="background:#cfc;"
| 2
| October 22
| Oklahoma City
| 
| Christian Wood (29)
| Tate, Wood (14)
| Kevin Porter Jr. (9)
| Toyota Center15,674
| 1–1
|-style="background:#fcc;"
| 3
| October 24
| Boston
| 
| Jalen Green (30)
| Christian Wood (9)
| Şengün, Tate (4)
| Toyota Center16,069
| 1–2
|-style="background:#fcc;"
| 4
| October 26
| @ Dallas
| 
| Eric Gordon (22)
| Christian Wood (17)
| Kevin Porter Jr. (8) 
| American Airlines Center19,337
| 1–3
|-style="background:#fcc;"
| 5
| October 28
| Utah
| 
| Christian Wood (16)
| Christian Wood (7)
| Green, Gordon (3)
| Toyota Center15,858
| 1–4
|-style="background:#fcc;"
| 6
| October 31
| @ L.A. Lakers
|  
| Eric Gordon (17)
| Christian Wood (13)
| Jalen Green (5)
| Staples Center16,448
| 1–5

|-style="background:#fcc;"
| 7
| November 2
| @ L.A. Lakers
| 
| Christian Wood (26) 
| Christian Wood (16)
| Kevin Porter Jr. (8)
| Staples Center18,997
| 1–6
|-style="background:#fcc;"
| 8
| November 4
| @ Phoenix
| 
| Kevin Porter Jr. (20)
| Christian Wood (15)
| Şengün, Wood (5)
| Footprint Center15,058
| 1–7
|-style="background:#fcc;"
| 9
| November 6
| @ Denver
| 
| Daniel Theis (18)
| Christian Wood (17)
| Kevin Porter Jr. (4)
| Ball Arena16,046
| 1–8
|-style="background:#fcc;"
| 10
| November 7
| @ Golden State
| 
| Jae'Sean Tate (21)
| Jae'Sean Tate (10)
| Kevin Porter Jr. (7)
| Chase Center18,064
| 1–9
|-style="background:#fcc;"
| 11
| November 10
| Detroit
| 
| Jalen Green (23)
| Christian Wood (9)
| Kevin Porter Jr. (5)
| Toyota Center15,350
| 1–10
|-style="background:#fcc;"
| 12
| November 12
| Portland
| 
| Kevin Porter Jr. (18)
| Christian Wood (15)
| Kevin Porter Jr. (5)
| Toyota Center15,468
| 1–11
|-style="background:#fcc;"
| 13
| November 14
| Phoenix
| 
| Christian Wood (17)
| Alperen Şengün (10)
| Kevin Porter Jr. (6)
| Toyota Center16,088
| 1–12
|-style="background:#fcc;"
| 14
| November 15
| @ Memphis
| 
| Jalen Green (15)
| Jae'Sean Tate (9)
| Augustin, Christopher (5)
| FedExForum11,482
| 1–13
|-style="background:#fcc;"
| 15
| November 17
| @ Oklahoma City
|  
| Jalen Green (21)
| Christian Wood (14)
| Eric Gordon (5)
| Paycom Center12,066
| 1–14
|-style="background:#fcc;"
| 16
| November 20
| @ New York
| 
| Christian Wood (18)
| Christian Wood (12)
| Eric Gordon (5)
| Madison Square Garden19,812
| 1–15
|-style="background:#fcc;"
| 17
| November 22
| @ Boston
| 
| Armoni Brooks (17)
| Christian Wood (9)
| Alperen Şengün (7)
| TD Garden19,156
| 1–16
|-style="background:#cfc;"
| 18
| November 24
| Chicago
| 
| Danuel House (18)
| Christian Wood (10)
| Kevin Porter Jr. (9) 
| Toyota Center16,074
| 2–16
|-style="background:#cfc;"
| 19
| November 27
| Charlotte
| 
| Christian Wood (33)
| Christian Wood (16)
| Kevin Porter Jr. (12)
| Toyota Center14,687
| 3–16
|-style="background:#cfc;"
| 20
| November 29
| Oklahoma City
| 
| Christian Wood (24)
| Christian Wood (21)
| Kevin Porter Jr. (11)
| Toyota Center12,829
| 4–16

|-style="background:#cfc;"
| 21
| December 1
| @ Oklahoma City
| 
| Jae'Sean Tate (32)
| Jae'Sean Tate (10)
| Jae'Sean Tate (7)
| Paycom Center13,222
| 5–16
|-style="background:#cfc;"
| 22
| December 3
| Orlando
| 
| Eric Gordon (24)
| Christian Wood (14)
| Kevin Porter Jr. (6)
| Toyota Center13,697
| 6–16
|-style="background:#cfc;"
| 23
| December 5
| New Orleans
| 
| Gordon, Wood (23)
| Christian Wood (8)
| Jae'Sean Tate (7)
| Toyota Center14,771
| 7–16
|-style="background:#cfc;"
| 24
| December 8
| Brooklyn
| 
| Eric Gordon (21)
| Christian Wood (15)
| Jae'Sean Tate (5)
| Toyota Center15,834
| 8–16
|-style="background:#fcc;"
| 25
| December 10
| Milwaukee
| 
| Garrison Mathews (23)
| Christian Wood (13)
| Jae'Sean Tate (9)
| Toyota Center16,319
| 8–17
|-style="background:#fcc;"
| 26
| December 11
| @ Memphis
| 
| Christian Wood (22)
| Christian Wood (11)
| Brooks, Şengün (6)
| FedExForum17,794
| 8–18
|-style="background:#cfc;"
| 27
| December 13
| @ Atlanta
| 
| Eric Gordon (32)
| Garrison Mathews (8)
| Şengün, Tate (4)
| State Farm Arena14,456
| 9–18
|-style="background:#fcc;"
| 28
| December 15
| @ Cleveland
| 
| Alperen Şengün (19)
| Alperen Şengün (11)
| Alperen Şengün (5)
| Rocket Mortgage FieldHouse17,131
| 9–19
|-style="background:#fcc;"
| 29
| December 16
| New York
| 
| Daniel Theis (22)
| Daniel Theis (10)
| Eric Gordon (9)
| Toyota Center13,857
| 9–20
|-style="background:#cfc;"
| 30
| December 18
| @ Detroit
| 
| Christian Wood (21)
| Kenyon Martin Jr. (11)
| Josh Christopher (7)
| Little Caesars Arena13,722
| 10–20
|-style="background:#fcc;"
| 31
| December 20
| @ Chicago
| 
| Christian Wood (23)
| Christian Wood (11)
| Gordon, Tate (6)
| United Center21,150
| 10–21
|-style="background:#fcc;"
| 32
| December 22
| @ Milwaukee
| 
| Christian Wood (20)
| Christian Wood (11)
| Gordon, Martin Jr. (6)
| Fiserv Forum17,341
| 10–22
|-style="background:#fcc;"
| 33
| December 23
| @ Indiana
| 
| Christian Wood (22) 
| Şengün, Wood (8)
| Eric Gordon (5)
| Gainbridge Fieldhouse15,089
| 10–23
|-style="background:#fcc;"
| 34
| December 27
| @ Charlotte
| 
| Trevelin Queen (17)
| Christian Wood (9)
| Armoni Brooks (4)
| Spectrum Center19,349
| 10–24
|-style="background:#fcc;"
| 35
| December 28
| L.A. Lakers
| 
| Jalen Green (24)
| David Nwaba (7)
| Kevin Porter Jr. (9)
| Toyota Center18,104
| 10–25
|-style="background:#fcc;"
| 36
| December 31
| Miami
| 
| Jae'Sean Tate (22)
| David Nwaba (10)
| Gordon, Porter Jr. (4)
| Toyota Center16,197
| 10–26

|-style="background:#fcc;"
| 37
| January 1
| Denver
| 
| Jalen Green (29)
| Kenyon Martin Jr. (7)
| Armoni Brooks (4)
| Toyota Center18,055
| 10–27
|-style="background:#fcc;"
| 38
| January 3
| @ Philadelphia
| 
| Garrison Mathews (23)
| Daniel Theis (9)
| Jae'Sean Tate (5)
| Wells Fargo Center20,026
| 10–28
|-style="background:#cfc;"
| 39
| January 5
| @ Washington
|  
| Green, Wood (22)
| Christian Wood (11)
| Kevin Porter Jr. (8)
| Capital One Arena13,014
| 11–28
|-style="background:#fcc;"
| 40
| January 7
| Dallas
|  
| Christian Wood (20)
| Jae'Sean Tate (8)
| Jae'Sean Tate (5)
| Toyota Center15,238
| 11–29
|-style="background:#fcc;"
| 41
| January 9
| Minnesota
| 
| Christian Wood (22)
| Christian Wood (8)
| Kevin Porter Jr. (8)
| Toyota Center15,277
| 11–30
|-style="background:#fcc;"
| 42
| January 11
| Philadelphia
| 
| Green, Wood (14)
| Porter Jr., Wood (6)
| Kevin Porter Jr. (5)
| Toyota Center13,593
| 11–31
|-style="background:#cfc;"
| 43
| January 12
| @ San Antonio
| 
| Eric Gordon (31)
| Christian Wood (11)
| Jae'Sean Tate (7)
| AT&T Center11,314
| 12–31
|-style="background:#fcc;"
| 44
| January 14
| @ Sacramento
| 
| Christian Wood (26)
| Jae'Sean Tate (10)
| Tate, Porter Jr. (8)
| Golden 1 Center12,857
| 12–32
|-style="background:#cfc;"
| 45
| January 16
| @ Sacramento
| 
| Porter Jr., Wood (23)
| Christian Wood (14)
| Kevin Porter Jr. (7)
| Golden 1 Center13,601
| 13–32
|-style="background:#cfc;"
| 46
| January 19
| @ Utah
| 
| Garrison Mathews (23)
| Christian Wood (15)
| Kevin Porter Jr. (8)
| Vivint Arena18,306
| 14–32
|-style="background:#fcc;"
| 47
| January 21
| @ Golden State
| 
| Christian Wood (19)
| Christian Wood (15)
| Kevin Porter Jr. (8)
| Chase Center18,064
| 14–33
|-style="background:#fcc;"
| 48
| January 25
| San Antonio
| 
| Kevin Porter Jr. (16)
| Kenyon Martin Jr. (8)
| Kevin Porter Jr. (9)
| Toyota Center15,007
| 14–34
|-style="background:#fcc;"
| 49
| January 28
| Portland
| 
| Mathews, Wood (21)
| Christian Wood (15)
| Green, Tate (5)
| Toyota Center16,100
| 14–35
|-style="background:#fcc;"
| 50
| January 31
| Golden State
| 
| Christian Wood (24)
| Christian Wood (13)
| Kevin Porter Jr. (11) 
| Toyota Center16,146
| 14–36

|-style="background:#cfc;"
| 51
| February 2
| Cleveland
| 
| Green, Wood (21)
| Alperen Sengun (8)
| Kevin Porter Jr. (7)
| Toyota Center14,163
| 15–36
|-style="background:#fcc;"
| 52
| February 4
| @ San Antonio
| 
| Josh Christopher (23)
| Christian Wood (11)
| Josh Christopher (4)
| AT&T Center15,344
| 15–37
|-style="background:#fcc;"
| 53
| February 6
| New Orleans
| 
| Christian Wood (22)
| Christian Wood (8)
| Kevin Porter Jr. (8)
| Toyota Center15,702
| 15–38
|-style="background:#fcc;"
| 54
| February 8
| @ New Orleans
| 
| Kevin Porter Jr. (27)
| Sengun, Wood, Tate (9)
| Kevin Porter Jr. (5)
| Smoothie King Center15,121
| 15–39
|-style="background:#fcc;"
| 55
| February 10
| Toronto
| 
| Kevin Porter Jr. (30)
| Christian Wood (11)
| Kevin Porter Jr. (8)
| Toyota Center16,129
| 15–40
|-style="background:#fcc;"
| 56
| February 14
| @ Utah
| 
| Kenyon Martin Jr. (16)
| Christian Wood (9)
| Kevin Porter Jr. (8)
| Vivint Arena18,306
| 15–41
|-style="background:#fcc;"
| 57
| February 16
| @ Phoenix
| 
| Dennis Schroder (23)
| Alperen Sengun (14)
| Dennis Schroder (9)
| Footprint Center17,071
| 15–42
|-style="background:#fcc;"
| 58
| February 17
| @ L.A. Clippers
| 
| Jalen Green (21)
| Christian Wood (7)
| Dennis Schroder (9)
| Staples Center17,519
| 15–43
|-style="background:#fcc;"
| 59
| February 25
| @ Orlando
| 
| Jalen Green (23)
| Christian Wood (11)
| Tate, Schroder (6)
| Amway Center16,631
| 15–44
|-style="background:#fcc;"
| 60
| February 27
| L.A. Clippers
| 
| Garrison Mathews (17)
| Dennis Schroder (8)
| Dennis Schroder (10)
| Toyota Center14,324
| 15–45

|-style="background:#fcc;"
| 61
| March 1
| L.A. Clippers
| 
| Jalen Green (20)
| Sengun, Tate (9)
| Dennis Schroder (6)
| Toyota Center12,949
| 15–46
|-style="background:#fcc;"
| 62
| March 2
| Utah
| 
| Jalen Green (27)
| Christian Wood (10)
| Kevin Porter Jr. (12)
| Toyota Center13,583
| 15–47
|-style="background:#fcc;"
| 63
| March 4
| @ Denver
| 
| Christian Wood (22)
| Sengun, Wood (10)
| Jalen Green (7)
| Ball Arena16,254
| 15–48
|-style="background:#cfc;"
| 64
| March 6
| Memphis
| 
| Kevin Porter Jr. (29)
| Christian Wood (13)
| Kevin Porter Jr. (5)
| Toyota Center18,055
| 16–48
|-style="background:#fcc;"
| 65
| March 7
| @ Miami
| 
| Kevin Porter Jr. (22) 
| Alperen Sengun (8)
| Daishen Nix (4)
| FTX Arena19,600
| 16–49
|-style="background:#cfc;"
| 66
| March 9
| L.A. Lakers
| 
| Jalen Green (32)
| Alperen Sengun (14)
| Kevin Porter Jr. (10)
| Toyota Center18,055
| 17–49
|-style="background:#fcc;"
| 67
| March 11
| Dallas
| 
| Christopher, Porter Jr. (17)
| Bruno Fernando (11)
| Dennis Schroder (7)
| Toyota Center15,060
| 17–50
|-style="background:#fcc;"
| 68
| March 13
| @ New Orleans
| 
| Jalen Green (17)
| Christian Wood (12)
| Nix, Porter Jr. (5)
| Smoothie King Center15,683
| 17–51
|-style="background:#fcc;"
| 69
| March 16
| Phoenix
| 
| Jalen Green (22)
| Christian Wood (9)
| Kevin Porter Jr. (8)
| Toyota Center18,055
| 17–52
|-style="background:#fcc;"
| 70
| March 18
| Indiana
| 
| Christian Wood (32)
| Christian Wood (13)
| Christian Wood (7)
| Toyota Center13,748
| 17–53
|-style="background:#fcc;"
| 71
| March 20
| Memphis
| 
| Dennis Schroder (17)
| Alperen Şengün (9)
| Josh Christopher (7)
| Toyota Center18,055
| 17–54
|-style="background:#cfc;"
| 72
| March 21
| Washington
| 
| Christian Wood (39)
| Christian Wood (10) 
| Jae'Sean Tate (6)
| Toyota Center13,936
| 18–54
|-style="background:#fcc;"
| 73
| March 23
| @ Dallas
| 
| Alperen Şengün (14)
| Alperen Şengün (11)
| Kevin Porter Jr. (5)
| American Airlines Center20,026
| 18–55
|-style="background:#cfc;"
| 74
| March 25
| @ Portland
| 
| Jalen Green (23)
| Christian Wood (11)
| Kevin Porter Jr. (7)
| Moda Center16,947
| 19–55
|-style="background:#cfc;"
| 75
| March 26
| @ Portland
| 
| Alperen Şengün (27)
| Alperen Şengün (7)
| Kevin Porter Jr. (11)
| Moda Center17,821
| 20–55
|-style="background:#fcc;"
| 76
| March 28
| San Antonio
| 
| Jalen Green (30)
| Kevin Porter Jr. (9)
| Kevin Porter Jr. (7)
| Toyota Center18,055
| 20–56
|-style="background:#fcc;"
| 77
| March 30
| Sacramento
| 
| Jalen Green (32)
| Kevin Porter Jr. (12)
| Kevin Porter Jr. (12)
| Toyota Center13,365
| 20–57

|-style="background:#fcc;"
| 78
| April 1
| Sacramento
| 
| Jalen Green (33)
| Usman Garuba (14)
| Kevin Porter Jr. (11)
| Toyota Center14,857
| 20–58
|-style="background:#fcc;"
| 79
| April 3
| Minnesota
| 
| Jalen Green (31)
| Alperen Sengun (15)
| Kevin Porter Jr. (8)
| Toyota Center16,539
| 20–59
|-style="background:#fcc;"
| 80
| April 5
| @ Brooklyn
| 
| Kevin Porter Jr. (36)
| Alperen Sengun (11)
| Alperen Sengun (5)
| Barclays Center17,768
| 20–60
|-style="background:#fcc;"
| 81
| April 8
| @ Toronto
| 
| Kevin Porter Jr. (35)
| Kevin Porter Jr. (10)
| Christopher, Porter Jr. (4)
| Scotiabank Arena19,800
| 20–61
|-style="background:#fcc;"
| 82
| April 10
| Atlanta
| 
| Jalen Green (41)
| Kevin Porter Jr. (8)
| Alperen Sengun (8)
| Toyota Center18,055
| 20–62

Player statistics

|-
| align="left"|‡ || align="center"| PG
| 34 || 2 || 510 || 41 || 74 || 10 || 0 || 182
|-
| align="left"|‡ || align="center"| SG
| 41 || 8 || 690 || 81 || 49 || 21 || 8 || 254
|-
| align="left"| || align="center"| SG
| 74 || 2 || 1,334 || 186 || 150 || 65 || 13 || 587
|-
| align="left"|≠ || align="center"| C
| 10 || 0 || 94 || 40 || 3 || 1 || 8 || 69
|-
| align="left"| || align="center"| PF
| 24 || 2 || 239 || 83 || 17 || 10 || 11 || 48
|-
| align="left"| || align="center"| SG
| 57 || 46 || 1,669 || 113 || 154 || 28 || 18 || 765
|-
| align="left"| || align="center"| SG
| 67 || 67 || style=";"|2,138 || 226 || 176 || 44 || 18 || 1,157
|-
| align="left"|‡ || align="center"| SF
| 16 || 1 || 233 || 43 || 19 || 5 || 5 || 77
|-
| align="left"| || align="center"| SF
| style=";"|79 || 2 || 1,656 || 297 || 101 || 34 || 40 || 696
|-
| align="left"| || align="center"| SG
| 65 || 33 || 1,712 || 190 || 64 || 57 || 24 || 650
|-
| align="left"| || align="center"| PG
| 24 || 0 || 261 || 33 || 40 || 15 || 0 || 77
|-
| align="left"| || align="center"| SF
| 46 || 4 || 609 || 151 || 35 || 28 || 20 || 233
|-
| align="left"| || align="center"| PG
| 61 || 61 || 1,907 || 267 || style=";"|376 || 69 || 22 || 949
|-
| align="left"|≠ || align="center"| SG
| 10 || 0 || 74 || 16 || 4 || 5 || 1 || 43
|-
| align="left"|≠ || align="center"| PG
| 15 || 4 || 404 || 50 || 88 || 12 || 3 || 163
|-
| align="left"| || align="center"| C
| 72 || 13 || 1,489 || 393 || 185 || 59 || style=";"|68 || 692
|-
| align="left"| || align="center"| SF
| 78 || style=";"|77 || 2,056 || 420 || 222 || style=";"|72 || 41 || 919
|-
| align="left"|† || align="center"| C
| 26 || 21 || 584 || 130 || 20 || 11 || 17 || 218
|-
| align="left"| || align="center"| C
| 68 || 67 || 2,094 || style=";"|686 || 155 || 54 || 65 || style=";"|1,218
|}
After all games.
‡Waived during the season
†Traded during the season
≠Acquired during the season

Transactions

Overview

Trades

Free agency

Re-signed

Additions

Subtractions

References

Houston Rockets seasons
Houston Rockets
Houston Rockets
Houston Rockets